The FIS Alpine World Ski Championships 2001 were held in St. Anton, Austria, between 29 January and 10 February, 2001.

Men's competitions

Downhill

Date: 7 February

Super-G

Date: 30 January

Giant Slalom

Date: 8 February

Slalom

Date: 10 February

Combination

Date: 5 February

Women's competitions

Downhill

Date: 6 February

Super-G

Date: 29 January

Giant Slalom

Date: 9 February

Slalom

Date: 7 February

Combination

Date: 2 February

Medals table
References

External links
FIS-ski.com – results – 2001 World Championships – St. Anton, Austria
FIS-ski.com – results – World Championships

FIS Alpine World Ski Championships
2001 in Austrian sport
2001
A
Sport in Tyrol (state)
Alpine skiing competitions in Austria
January 2001 sports events in Europe
February 2001 sports events in Europe